Josef Epp (1 March 1920 – 28 February 1989) was an Austrian footballer, who competed at the 1948 Summer Olympic Games. He played in the forward position.

References

External links

Josef Epp's profile at Sports Reference.com

1920 births
1989 deaths
Austrian footballers
Austria international footballers
Austrian expatriate footballers
Olympic footballers of Austria
Footballers at the 1948 Summer Olympics
Association football forwards